Alessia Lombardi (born May 24 1976) is an Italian former professional tennis player.

Born in Rome, Lombardi reached a career-high singles ranking of 267 in the world and won two ITF singles titles.

She fell in the final qualifying round for the 1998 Istanbul Open, but featured in the doubles draw (partnering Gisela Riera), for what was her only WTA Tour main-draw appearance.

ITF finals

Singles: 7 (2–5)

Doubles: 6 (4–2)

References

External links
 
 

1976 births
Living people
Italian female tennis players
Tennis players from Rome